In physics, gravity is a fundamental interaction which causes mutual attraction between all things with mass or energy. Gravity is, by far, the weakest of the four fundamental interactions, approximately 1038 times weaker than the strong interaction, 1036 times weaker than the electromagnetic force and 1029 times weaker than the weak interaction. As a result, it has no significant influence at the level of subatomic particles. However, gravity is the most significant interaction between objects at the macroscopic scale, and it determines the motion of planets, stars, galaxies, and even light.

On Earth, gravity gives weight to physical objects, and the Moon's gravity is responsible for sublunar tides in the oceans (the corresponding antipodal tide is caused by the inertia of the Earth and Moon orbiting one another). Gravity also has many important biological functions, helping to guide the growth of plants through the process of gravitropism and influencing the circulation of fluids in multicellular organisms. Investigation into the effects of weightlessness has shown that gravity may play a role in immune system function and cell differentiation within the human body.

The gravitational attraction between the original gaseous matter in the universe allowed it to coalesce and form stars which eventually condensed into galaxies, so gravity is responsible for many of the large-scale structures in the universe. Gravity has an infinite range, although its effects become weaker as objects get farther away.

Gravity is most accurately described by the general theory of relativity (proposed by Albert Einstein in 1915), which describes gravity not as a force, but as the curvature of spacetime, caused by the uneven distribution of mass, and causing masses to move along geodesic lines. The most extreme example of this curvature of spacetime is a black hole, from which nothing—not even light—can escape once past the black hole's event horizon. However, for most applications, gravity is well approximated by Newton's law of universal gravitation, which describes gravity as a force causing any two bodies to be attracted toward each other, with magnitude proportional to the product of their masses and inversely proportional to the square of the distance between them:

Current models of particle physics imply that the earliest instance of gravity in the universe, possibly in the form of quantum gravity, supergravity or a gravitational singularity, along with ordinary space and time, developed during the Planck epoch (up to 10−43 seconds after the birth of the universe), possibly from a primeval state, such as a false vacuum, quantum vacuum or virtual particle, in a currently unknown manner. Scientists are currently working to develop a theory of gravity consistent with quantum mechanics, a quantum gravity theory, which would allow gravity to be united in a common mathematical framework (a theory of everything) with the other three fundamental interactions of physics.

Definitions
Gravitation is the mutual attraction between all masses in the universe, also known as gravitational attration. Gravity is the gravitational attraction at the surface of a planet or other celestial body.

History

Ancient world
The nature and mechanism of gravity was explored by a wide range of ancient scholars. In Greece, Aristotle believed that objects fell towards the Earth because the Earth was the center of the Universe and attracted all of the mass in the Universe towards it. He also thought that the speed of a falling object should increase with its weight, a conclusion which was later shown to be false. While Aristotle's view was widely accepted throughout Ancient Greece, there were other thinkers such as Plutarch who correctly predicted that the attraction of gravity was not unique to the Earth.

Although he didn't understand gravity as a force, the ancient Greek philosopher Archimedes discovered the center of gravity of a triangle. He also postulated that if two equal weights did not have the same center of gravity, the center of gravity of the two weights together would be in the middle of the line that joins their centers of gravity.Two centuries later, the Roman engineer and architect Vitruvius contended in his De architectura that gravity is not dependent on a substance's weight but rather on its "nature".
In the 6th century CE, the Byzantine Alexandrian scholar John Philoponus proposed the theory of impetus, which modifies Aristotle's theory that "continuation of motion depends on continued action of a force" by incorporating a causative force which diminishes over time.

In India, the mathematician-astronomer Aryabhata first identified gravity to explain why objects are not driven away from the Earth by the centrifugal force of the planet's rotation. Later, in the seventh century CE, Brahmagupta proposed the idea that gravity is an attractive force which draws objects to the Earth and used the term gurutvākarṣaṇ to describe it.

In the ancient Middle East, gravity was a topic of fierce debate. The Persian intellectual Al-Biruni believed that the force of gravity was not unique to the Earth, and he correctly assumed that other heavenly bodies should exert a gravitational attraction as well. In contrast, Al-Khazini held the same position as Aristotle that all matter in the Universe is attracted to the center of the Earth.

Scientific revolution

In the mid-16th century, various European scientists experimentally disproved the Aristotelian notion that heavier objects fall at a faster rate. In particular, the Spanish Dominican priest Domingo de Soto wrote in 1551 that bodies in free fall uniformly accelerate. De Soto may have been influenced by earlier experiments conducted by other Dominican priests in Italy, including those by Benedetto Varchi, Francesco Beato, Luca Ghini, and Giovan Bellaso which contradicted Aristotle's teachings on the fall of bodies. The mid-16th century Italian physicist Giambattista Benedetti published papers claiming that, due to specific gravity, objects made of the same material but with different masses would fall at the same speed. With the 1586 Delft tower experiment, the Flemish physicist Simon Stevin observed that two cannonballs of differing sizes and weights fell at the same rate when dropped from a tower. Finally, in the late 16th century, Galileo Galilei's careful measurements of balls rolling down inclines allowed him to firmly establish that gravitational acceleration is the same for all objects. Galileo postulated that air resistance is the reason that objects with a low density and high surface area fall more slowly in an atmosphere. 

In 1604, Galileo correctly hypothesized that the distance of a falling object is proportional to the square of the time elapsed. This was later confirmed by Italian scientists Jesuits Grimaldi and Riccioli between 1640 and 1650. They also calculated the magnitude of the Earth's gravity by measuring the oscillations of a pendulum.

Newton's theory of gravitation

In 1684, Newton sent a manuscript to Edmond Halley titled De motu corporum in gyrum ('On the motion of bodies in an orbit'), which provided a physical justification for Kepler's laws of planetary motion. Halley was impressed by the manuscript and urged Newton to expand on it, and a few years later Newton published a groundbreaking book called Philosophiæ Naturalis Principia Mathematica (Mathematical Principles of Natural Philosophy). In this book, Newton described gravitation as a universal force, and claimed  that "the forces which keep the planets in their orbs must [be] reciprocally as the squares of their distances from the centers about which they revolve." This statement was later condensed into the following inverse-square law:

Newton's Principia was well-received by the scientific community, and his law of gravitation quickly spread across the European world. More than a century later, in 1821, his theory of gravitation rose to even greater prominence when it was used to predict the existence of Neptune. In that year, the French astronomer Alexis Bouvard used this theory to create a table modeling the orbit of Uranus, which was shown to differ significantly from the planet's actual trajectory. In order to explain this discrepancy, many astronomers speculated that there might be a large object beyond the orbit of Uranus which was disrupting its orbit. In 1846, the astronomers John Couch Adams and Urbain Le Verrier independently used Newton's law to predict Neptune's location in the night sky, and the planet was discovered there within a day.

General relativity

Eventually, astronomers noticed an eccentricity in the orbit of the planet Mercury which could not be explained by Newton's theory: the perihelion of the orbit was increasing by about 42.98 arcseconds per century. The most obvious explanation for this discrepancy was an as-yet-undiscovered celestial body (such as a planet orbiting the Sun even closer than Mercury), but all efforts to find such a body turned out to be fruitless. Finally, in 1915, Albert Einstein developed a theory of general relativity which was able to accurately model Mercury's orbit. 

In general relativity, the effects of gravitation are ascribed to spacetime curvature instead of a force. Einstein began to toy with this idea in the form of the equivalence principle, a discovery which he later described as "the happiest thought of my life." In this theory, free fall is considered to be equivalent to inertial motion, meaning that free-falling inertial objects are accelerated relative to non-inertial observers on the ground. In contrast to Newtonian physics, Einstein believed that it was possible for this acceleration to occur without any force being applied to the object.

Einstein proposed that spacetime is curved by matter, and that free-falling objects are moving along locally straight paths in curved spacetime. These straight paths are called geodesics. As in Newton's first law of motion, Einstein believed that a force applied to an object would cause it to deviate from a geodesic. For instance, people standing on the surface of the Earth are prevented from following a geodesic path because the mechanical resistance of the Earth exerts an upward force on them. This explains why moving along the geodesics in spacetime is considered inertial.

Einstein's description of gravity was quickly accepted by the majority of physicists, as it was able to explain a wide variety of previously baffling experimental results. In the coming years, a wide range of experiments provided additional support for the idea of general relativity. Today, Einstein's theory of relativity is used for all gravitational calculations where absolute precision is desired, although Newton's inverse-square law continues to be a useful and fairly accurate approximation.

Modern research 
In modern physics, general relativity remains the framework for the understanding of gravity. Physicists continue to work to find solutions to the Einstein field equations that form the basis of general relativity, while some scientists have speculated that general relativity may not be applicable at all in certain scenarios.

Einstein field equations 
The Einstein field equations are a system of 10 partial differential equations which describe how matter affects the curvature of spacetime. The system is often expressed in the form

The constant  is referred to as the Einstein gravitational constant.

A major area of research is the discovery of exact solutions to the Einstein field equations. Solving these equations amounts to calculating a precise value for the metric tensor (which defines the curvature and geometry of spacetime) under certain physical conditions. There is no formal definition for what constitutes such solutions, but most scientists agree that they should be expressable using elementary functions or linear differential equations. Some of the most notable solutions of the equations include: 
 The Schwarzschild solution, which describes spacetime surrounding a spherically symmetric non-rotating uncharged massive object. For compact enough objects, this solution generated a black hole with a central singularity. At points far away from the central mass, the accelerations predicted by the Schwarzschild solution are practically identical to those predicted by Newton's theory of gravity.
 The Reissner–Nordström solution, which analyzes a non-rotating spherically symmetric object with charge and was independently discovered by several different researchers between 1916 and 1921. In some cases, this solution can predict the existence of black holes with double event horizons.
 The Kerr solution, which generalizes the Schwarzchild solution to rotating massive objects. Because of the difficulty of factoring in the effects of rotation into the Einstein field equations, this solution was not discovered until 1963.
 The Kerr–Newman solution for charged, rotating massive objects. This solution was derived in 1964, using the same technique of complex coordinate transformation that was used for the Kerr solution. 
 The cosmological Friedmann–Lemaître–Robertson–Walker solution, discovered in 1922 by Alexander Friedmann and then confirmed in 1927 by Georges Lemaître. This solution was revolutionary for predicting the expansion of the Universe, which was confirmed seven years later after a series of measurements by Edwin Hubble. It even showed that general relativity was incompatible with a static universe, and Einstein later conceded that he had been wrong to design his field equations to account for a Universe that was not expanding.

Today, there remain many important situations in which the Einstein field equations have not been solved. Chief among these is the two-body problem, which concerns the geometry of spacetime around two mutually interacting massive objects (such as the Sun and the Earth, or the two stars in a binary star system). The situation gets even more complicated when considering the interactions of three or more massive bodies (the "n-body problem"), and some scientists suspect that the Einstein field equations will never be solved in this context. However, it is still possible to construct an approximate solution to the field equations in the n-body problem by using the technique of post-Newtonian expansion. In general, the extreme nonlinearity of the Einstein field equations makes it difficult to solve them in all but the most specific cases.

Gravity and quantum mechanics

Despite its success in predicting the effects of gravity at large scales, general relativity is ultimately incompatible with quantum mechanics. This is because general relativity describes gravity as a smooth, continuous distortion of spacetime, while quantum mechanics holds that all forces arise from the exchange of discrete particles known as quanta. This contradiction is especially vexing to physicists because the other three fundamental forces (strong force, weak force and electromagnetism) were reconciled with a quantum framework decades ago. As a result, modern researchers have begun to search for a theory that could unite both gravity and quantum mechanics under a more general framework.

One path is to describe gravity in the framework of quantum field theory, which has been successful to accurately describe the other fundamental interactions. The electromagnetic force arises from an exchange of virtual photons, where the QFT description of gravity is that there is an exchange of virtual gravitons. This description reproduces general relativity in the classical limit. However, this approach fails at short distances of the order of the Planck length, where a more complete theory of quantum gravity (or a new approach to quantum mechanics) is required.

Tests of general relativity 
Testing the predictions of general relativity has historically been difficult, because they are almost identical to the predictions of Newtonian gravity for small energies and masses. Still, since its development, an ongoing series of experimental results have provided support for the theory:

 In 1919, the British astrophysicist Arthur Eddington was able to confirm the predicted gravitational lensing of light during that year's solar eclipse. Eddington measured starlight deflections twice those predicted by Newtonian corpuscular theory, in accordance with the predictions of general relativity. Although Eddington's analysis was later disputed, this experiment made Einstein famous almost overnight and caused general relativity to become widely accepted in the scientific community.
 In 1959, American physicists Robert Pound and Glen Rebka performed an experiment in which they used gamma rays to confirm the prediction of gravitational time dilation. By sending the rays down a 74-foot tower and measuring their frequency at the bottom, the scientists confirmed that light is redshifted as it moves towards a source of gravity. The observed redshift also supported the idea that time runs more slowly in the presence of a gravitational field.
 The time delay of light passing close to a massive object was first identified by Irwin I. Shapiro in 1964 in interplanetary spacecraft signals.
In 1971, scientists discovered the first-ever black hole in the galaxy Cygnus. The black hole was detected because it was emitting bursts of x-rays as it consumed a smaller star, and it came to be known as Cygnus X-1. This discovery confirmed yet another prediction of general relativity, because Einstein's equations implied that light could not escape from a sufficiently large and compact object.
General relativity states that gravity acts on light and matter equally, meaning that a sufficiently massive object could warp light around it and create a gravitational lens. This phenomenon was first confirmed by observation in 1979 using the 2.1 meter telescope at Kitt Peak National Observatory in Arizona, which saw two mirror images of the same quasar whose light had been bent around the galaxy YGKOW G1.
Frame dragging, the idea that a rotating massive object should twist spacetime around it, was confirmed by Gravity Probe B results in 2011.
In 2015, the LIGO observatory detected faint gravitational waves, the existence of which had been predicted by general relativity. Scientists believe that the waves emanated from a black hole merger that occurred 1.5 billion light-years away.

Specifics

Earth's gravity

Every planetary body (including the Earth) is surrounded by its own gravitational field, which can be conceptualized with Newtonian physics as exerting an attractive force on all objects. Assuming a spherically symmetrical planet, the strength of this field at any given point above the surface is proportional to the planetary body's mass and inversely proportional to the square of the distance from the center of the body.

The strength of the gravitational field is numerically equal to the acceleration of objects under its influence. The rate of acceleration of falling objects near the Earth's surface varies very slightly depending on latitude, surface features such as mountains and ridges, and perhaps unusually high or low sub-surface densities. For purposes of weights and measures, a standard gravity value is defined by the International Bureau of Weights and Measures, under the International System of Units (SI).

The force of gravity on Earth is the resultant (vector sum) of two forces: (a) The gravitational attraction in accordance with Newton's universal law of gravitation, and (b) the centrifugal force, which results from the choice of an earthbound, rotating frame of reference. The force of gravity is weakest at the equator because of the centrifugal force caused by the Earth's rotation and because points on the equator are furthest from the center of the Earth. The force of gravity varies with latitude and increases from about 9.780 m/s2 at the Equator to about 9.832 m/s2 at the poles. Canada's Hudson Bay has less gravity than any place on Earth.

Origin
The earliest gravity (possibly in the form of quantum gravity, supergravity or a gravitational singularity), along with ordinary space and time, developed during the Planck epoch (up to 10−43 seconds after the birth of the Universe), possibly from a primeval state (such as a false vacuum, quantum vacuum or virtual particle), in a currently unknown manner.

Gravitational radiation

General relativity predicts that energy can be transported out of a system through gravitational radiation. The first indirect evidence for gravitational radiation was through measurements of the Hulse–Taylor binary in 1973. This system consists of a pulsar and neutron star in orbit around one another. Its orbital period has decreased since its initial discovery due to a loss of energy, which is consistent for the amount of energy loss due to gravitational radiation. This research was awarded the Nobel Prize in Physics in 1993.

The first direct evidence for gravitational radiation was measured on 14 September 2015 by the LIGO detectors. The gravitational waves emitted during the collision of two black holes 1.3 billion light years from Earth were measured. This observation confirms the theoretical predictions of Einstein and others that such waves exist. It also opens the way for practical observation and understanding of the nature of gravity and events in the Universe including the Big Bang. Neutron star and black hole formation also create detectable amounts of gravitational radiation. This research was awarded the Nobel Prize in Physics in 2017.

Speed of gravity

In December 2012, a research team in China announced that it had produced measurements of the phase lag of Earth tides during full and new moons which seem to prove that the speed of gravity is equal to the speed of light. This means that if the Sun suddenly disappeared, the Earth would keep orbiting the vacant point normally for 8 minutes, which is the time light takes to travel that distance. The team's findings were released in Science Bulletin in February 2013.

In October 2017, the LIGO and Virgo detectors received gravitational wave signals within 2 seconds of gamma ray satellites and optical telescopes seeing signals from the same direction. This confirmed that the speed of gravitational waves was the same as the speed of light.

Anomalies and discrepancies

There are some observations that are not adequately accounted for, which may point to the need for better theories of gravity or perhaps be explained in other ways.

 Extra-fast stars: Stars in galaxies follow a distribution of velocities where stars on the outskirts are moving faster than they should according to the observed distributions of normal matter. Galaxies within galaxy clusters show a similar pattern. Dark matter, which would interact through gravitation but not electromagnetically, would account for the discrepancy. Various modifications to Newtonian dynamics have also been proposed.
 Flyby anomaly: Various spacecraft have experienced greater acceleration than expected during gravity assist maneuvers.
 Accelerating expansion: The metric expansion of space seems to be speeding up. Dark energy has been proposed to explain this. A recent alternative explanation is that the geometry of space is not homogeneous (due to clusters of galaxies) and that when the data are reinterpreted to take this into account, the expansion is not speeding up after all, however this conclusion is disputed.
 Anomalous increase of the astronomical unit: Recent measurements indicate that planetary orbits are widening faster than if this were solely through the Sun losing mass by radiating energy.
 Extra energetic photons: Photons travelling through galaxy clusters should gain energy and then lose it again on the way out. The accelerating expansion of the Universe should stop the photons returning all the energy, but even taking this into account photons from the cosmic microwave background radiation gain twice as much energy as expected. This may indicate that gravity falls off faster than inverse-squared at certain distance scales.
 Extra massive hydrogen clouds: The spectral lines of the Lyman-alpha forest suggest that hydrogen clouds are more clumped together at certain scales than expected and, like dark flow, may indicate that gravity falls off slower than inverse-squared at certain distance scales.

Alternative theories

Historical alternative theories
 Aristotelian theory of gravity
 Le Sage's theory of gravitation (1784) also called LeSage gravity but originally proposed by Fatio and further elaborated by Georges-Louis Le Sage, based on a fluid-based explanation where a light gas fills the entire Universe.
 Ritz's theory of gravitation, Ann. Chem. Phys. 13, 145, (1908) pp. 267–271, Weber–Gauss electrodynamics applied to gravitation. Classical advancement of perihelia.
 Nordström's theory of gravitation (1912, 1913), an early competitor of general relativity.
 Kaluza Klein theory (1921)
 Whitehead's theory of gravitation (1922), another early competitor of general relativity.

Modern alternative theories
 Brans–Dicke theory of gravity (1961)
 Induced gravity (1967), a proposal by Andrei Sakharov according to which general relativity might arise from quantum field theories of matter
String theory (late 1960s)
 ƒ(R) gravity (1970)
 Horndeski theory (1974)
 Supergravity (1976)
 In the modified Newtonian dynamics (MOND) (1981), Mordehai Milgrom proposes a modification of Newton's second law of motion for small accelerations
 The self-creation cosmology theory of gravity (1982) by G.A. Barber in which the Brans–Dicke theory is modified to allow mass creation
 Loop quantum gravity (1988) by Carlo Rovelli, Lee Smolin, and Abhay Ashtekar
 Nonsymmetric gravitational theory (NGT) (1994) by John Moffat
Tensor–vector–scalar gravity (TeVeS) (2004), a relativistic modification of MOND by Jacob Bekenstein
Chameleon theory (2004) by Justin Khoury and Amanda Weltman.
 Pressuron theory (2013) by Olivier Minazzoli and Aurélien Hees.
Conformal gravity
Gravity as an entropic force, gravity arising as an emergent phenomenon from the thermodynamic concept of entropy.
In the superfluid vacuum theory the gravity and curved spacetime arise as a collective excitation mode of non-relativistic background superfluid.
Massive gravity, a theory where gravitons and gravitational waves have a non-zero mass

See also

 Anti-gravity, the idea of neutralizing or repelling gravity
 Artificial gravity
 Equations for a falling body
Escape velocity
Atmospheric escape
 Gauss's law for gravity
 Gravitational potential
 Micro-g environment, also called microgravity
 Newton's laws of motion
 Standard gravitational parameter
 Weightlessness

Footnotes

References

Further reading

External links

 The Feynman Lectures on Physics Vol. I Ch. 7: The Theory of Gravitation
 
 

 
Fundamental interactions
Acceleration
Articles containing video clips
Empirical laws